Events from the year 1224 in Ireland.

Incumbent
Lord: Henry III

Events
Richard Mór de Burgh claims the title Lord of Connaught on the basis of a grant to his father, and that Aedh Ua Conchobair (successor to his father Cathal Crobhdearg Ua Conchobair, King of Connacht) has forfeited it.
Dominican Order set up in Ireland. They are the first mendicant friars in Ireland. At about this date, Lucas de Netterville, Archbishop of Armagh, founds a Dominican friary in Drogheda.
South Abbey, Youghal, the proto-friary of the Irish Province of the Observant Franciscans, is founded by Maurice FitzGerald, 2nd Lord of Offaly, dedicated to St. Nicholas.
Annals of Connacht begin.

Births

Deaths
Cú Ceanain Ó Con Ceanainn, King of Uí Díarmata.
Cathal Crobhdearg Ua Conchobair, last independent King of Connacht (born 1153).
Muirghis Cananach Ua Conchobhair, Prince of Connacht, monk and poet.
Donnchadh Mor O Dalaigh, poet.
Gilla na Naemh Crom Ó Seachnasaigh, Lord of Cenél Áeda na hEchtge.
Simon Rochfort, Bishop of Meath.

References

 
1220s in Ireland
Ireland
Years of the 13th century in Ireland